Sigita Markevičienė née Kriaučiūninė (born 6 May 1962) is a Lithuanian Paralympic athlete who competed in middle-distance running events at international track and field competitions. She is a six-time Paralympic medalist and a former world record holder in the 1500m B1 and 5000m B1. Markevičienė lost her sight in 1986 following a car accident.

References

1962 births
Living people
Sportspeople from Panevėžys
Paralympic athletes of Lithuania
Lithuanian female sprinters
Lithuanian female middle-distance runners
Athletes (track and field) at the 1992 Summer Paralympics
Athletes (track and field) at the 1996 Summer Paralympics
Athletes (track and field) at the 2000 Summer Paralympics
Athletes (track and field) at the 2004 Summer Paralympics
Medalists at the 1992 Summer Paralympics
Medalists at the 1996 Summer Paralympics